SKLH Žďár nad Sázavou is a Czech ice hockey team located in Žďár nad Sázavou, currently playing in the 2nd Czech Republic Hockey League, the third level of Czech ice hockey. It began play in 1939.

External links
  Official website

Ice hockey teams in the Czech Republic
Žďár nad Sázavou District